The Trumpchi GA8 is a full-size/executive sedan produced by GAC Group under the Trumpchi brand in China and the GAC Motor brand globally.



First generation

Previewed by the Trumpchi GA8 concept during the 2015 Shanghai Auto Show, the production version debuted in April 2016. 

Pricing of the GA8 ranges from 149,800 yuan to 259,800 yuan. 

The GA8 2.0-litre turbo is designated as the 320T. A 1.8-litre turbo engine was also available.

2021 model year

The Trumpchi GA8 received a facelift for the 2021 model year and was unveiled during the 2020 Beijing Auto Show. Both the exterior and interior was redesigned. The updated interior features a redesigned dashboard with a minimalist design. Most of the buttons were moved above the center airconditioning vents. A digital upgrade was also added, with the analog instrument cluster being replaced by a 12.3-inch display and beside it is a 12.3-inch touchscreen infotainment system in the center.

The 2021 GA8 is equipped with the Trumpchi third-generation 390T engine. The turbocharged 2.0-litre engine produces  and  torque, mated to a 6-speed automatic transmission.

The range-topping model of the 2021 GAC GA8 retails for 226,800 yuan in China.

See also
 List of GAC vehicles

References

External links
 
 (Global)

2010s cars
GA8
Cars introduced in 2016
Full-size vehicles
Sedans
Cars of China
Front-wheel-drive vehicles